Erik Anthony Audé (born April 5, 1980) is an American actor, stuntman, restaurateur, and professional poker player who was arrested and imprisoned in Pakistan for alleged drug trafficking. Audé maintains that he was duped into carrying opium and believed he was importing leather goods. This story is featured in an episode of National Geographic's Locked Up Abroad wherein he plays his own role, and in the Documentary “3 Years In Pakistan: The Erik Audé Story”. Which is free on Amazon Prime.

History
Audé was born in Los Angeles, California. He attended Bethel Christian School in Lancaster, California, and played American football there.

In 2002, Audé was persuaded to carry leather samples from Islamabad, Pakistan, to the United States by Razmik Minasian (who used the alias Rai Gharizian), an Armenian client at the gymnasium where Audé was employed. Minasian concealed from Audé the fact that the case containing leather skirts and jackets also contained opium. On February 15, 2002, Audé was arrested at Islamabad International Airport after being found, according to Pakistani authorities, with 3.6 kilograms (7.9 pounds) of opium in the process of embarking on his scheduled flight to Dubai, United Arab Emirates.

Pakistan is not a party to the United States' Prison Transfer Treaty program. The actor, convicted in January 2003, began serving a sentence of seven years at the Adiala Central Jail in nearby Rawalpindi. At the time, a number of articles in the press speculated on the odds of his surviving the full term of his seven-year sentence.

Audé's 2004 release followed an appeal by New Mexico Governor Bill Richardson just before Christmas, and followed Minasian's written confession that Audé was innocent of knowing he was being used to smuggle opium. A number of websites were set up to help promote his cause, and to document the struggle to free him. The actor arrived at Los Angeles International Airport on December 26, 2004, after entering the United States at Chicago's O'Hare International Airport. As of 2009 Audé lives in the San Fernando Valley.

Filmography

References

Further reading
 Gleason, Meg. "Locked Up Abroad: Where Are They Now? Erik Aude". (Archive). National Geographic. April 25, 2010.
 Fausset, Richard. "Mom Tries to Get Son Freed From Pakistan". Los Angeles Times. October 27, 2003.

External links
 
 
 Crime Library article
 Erik Audé Blog - The Pokerdonk

Male actors from California
American male film actors
American drug traffickers
American people imprisoned abroad
Prisoners and detainees of Pakistan
1980 births
Living people
American expatriates in Pakistan